Dendrophilia solitaria is a moth of the family Gelechiidae. It was described by Ponomarenko in 1993. It is found in Russia (Primorskii krai).

References

solitaria
Moths described in 1993